The Individual Men event was held on July 24.

Results

References

Individuel Men
2009 in gymnastics